Tribus was the name for Roman tribes and may also refer to

 Tribe, a social group, originally:
 Tribus (song), an EP  released by Brazilian Thrash metal  band Sepultura
 Myron Tribus (1929–2016), director of the Center for Advanced Engineering Study at MIT
 Tribus (carriage), a type of cabriolet, a horse-drawn carriage
 Tribe (biology), a taxonomical rank